Eva Burch is an American politician and nurse. Burch was elected in 2022 to serve in the Arizona State Senate representing District 9 as a member of the Democratic Party. Burch defeated Republican Robert Scantlebury in the general election, one of several legislative candidates who had been endorsed by President Donald Trump in Arizona.

Education
Burch attended the Pima Medical Institute, and began a career in emergency nursing in 2012, later obtaining her master's degree and nurse practitioner credentials.

References

Year of birth missing (living people)
Living people
Democratic Party Arizona state senators
21st-century American politicians
21st-century American women politicians
American nurses
American women nurses